Ilpo Juhani Nieminen (born September 12, 1961 Lempäälä) is a Finnish sprint canoer who competed in the mid-1980s. He was eliminated in the semifinals in both the K-2 500 m and the K-4 1000 m events at the 1984 Summer Olympics in Los Angeles.

References
 Sports-Reference.com profile

1961 births
Canoeists at the 1984 Summer Olympics
Finnish male canoeists
Living people
Olympic canoeists of Finland